Richard Pollard McClain (1890 - 1965) was a doctor, businessman, and state legislator in Ohio. He was born in Nicholasville, Kentucky to Meredith and Ellen McClain. He lived in Cincinnati as a teenager. He studied at Cincinnati High School and Howard University. He married Alice E. Martin in 1918. He worked in Cincinnati.

He served on the city council in 1935 and 1937. He was accused of performing an illegal abortion. He was a Republican.

He was a dentist. He sponsored a bill prohibiting employment discrimination in the public sector.

See also
Chester K. Gillespie

References

1890 births
1965 deaths
20th-century African-American politicians
20th-century American politicians
Ohio city council members
American dentists
Businesspeople from Cincinnati
Politicians from Cincinnati
People from Nicholasville, Kentucky
Republican Party members of the Ohio House of Representatives
African-American state legislators in Ohio
Howard University alumni
African-American men in politics